Mother Nature (sometimes known as Mother Earth or the Earth Mother) is a personification of nature that focuses on the life-giving and nurturing aspects of nature by embodying it, in the form of the mother.

European tradition history

The word "nature" comes from the Latin word, "natura", meaning birth or character (see nature (philosophy)). In English, its first recorded use (in the sense of the entirety of the phenomena of the world) was in 1266. "Natura" and the personification of Mother Nature were widely popular in the Middle Ages. As a concept, seated between the properly divine and the human, it can be traced to Ancient Greece, though Earth (or "Eorthe" in the Old English period) may have been personified as a goddess. The Norse also had a goddess called Jörð (Jord, or Erth).

The earliest written usage is in Mycenaean Greek: Ma-ka (transliterated as ma-ga), "Mother Gaia", written in Linear B syllabic script (13th or 12th century BC). In Greece, the pre-Socratic philosophers had "invented" nature when they abstracted the entirety of phenomena of the world as singular: physis, and this was inherited by Aristotle. Later medieval Christian thinkers did not see nature as inclusive of everything, but thought that she had been created by God; her place lay on earth, below the unchanging heavens and moon.  Nature lay somewhere in the center, with agents above her (angels), and below her (demons and hell). For the medieval mind she was only a personification, not a goddess.

Greek myth

In Greek mythology, Persephone, daughter of Demeter (goddess of the harvest), was abducted by Hades (god of the dead), and taken to the underworld as his  queen. Demeter was so distraught that no crops would grow and the "entire human race [would] have perished of cruel, biting hunger if Zeus had not been concerned" (Larousse 152). Zeus forced Hades to return Persephone to her mother, but while in the underworld, Persephone had eaten pomegranate seeds, the food of the dead and thus, she must spend part of each year with Hades in the underworld. Demeter's grief for her daughter in the realm of the dead, is reflected in the barren winter months and her joy when Persephone returns is reflected in the bountiful summer months

Ancient Rome

Roman Epicurean poet Lucretius opens his didactic poem De rerum natura by addressing Venus as a veritable mother of nature. Lucretius uses Venus as "a personified symbol for the generative aspect of nature". This largely has to do with the nature of Lucretius' work, which presents a nontheistic understanding of the world that eschews superstition

Basque mythology

Amalur (sometimes Ama Lur or Ama Lurra) was the goddess of the earth in the religion of the ancient Basque people. She was the mother of Ekhi, the sun, and Ilazki, the moon. Her name means "mother earth" or "mother land"; the 1968 Basque documentary Ama lur was a celebration of the Basque countryside.

Indigenous peoples of America
Algonquian legend says that "beneath the clouds lives the Earth-Mother from whom is derived the Water of Life, who at her bosom feeds plants, animals and human" (Larousse 428). She is otherwise known as Nokomis, the Grandmother.

In Inca mythology, Mama Pacha or Pachamama is a fertility goddess who presides over planting and harvesting. Pachamama is usually translated as "Mother Earth" but a more literal translation would be "Mother Universe" (in Aymara and Quechua mama = mother / pacha = world, space-time or the universe). Pachamama and her husband, Inti, are the most benevolent deities and are worshiped in parts of the Andean mountain ranges (stretching from present day Ecuador to Chile and Argentina).

In her book Coateteleco, pueblo indígena de pescadores ("Coatetelco, indigenous fishing town", Cuernavaca, Morelos: Vettoretti, 2015), Teódula Alemán Cleto states, En nuestra cultura prehispánica el respeto y la fe a nuestra madre naturaleza fueron primordiales para vivir en plena armonía como seres humanos. ("In our [Mexican] prehispanic culture, respect and faith in our Mother Nature (emphasis added) were paramount to living in full harmony as human beings.")

Southeast Asia
In the Mainland Southeast Asian countries of Cambodia, Laos and Thailand, earth (terra firma) is personified as Phra Mae Thorani, but her role in Buddhist mythology differs considerably from that of Mother Nature. In the Malay Archipelago, that role is filled by Dewi Sri, The Rice-mother in the East Indies.

Popular culture
 In the early 1970s, a television ad featured character actress Dena Dietrich as Mother Nature. Vexed by an off-screen narrator who informs her she has mistaken Chiffon margarine for butter, she responds with the trademarked slogan "It's not nice to fool Mother Nature" (underscored by thunder and lightning).
 Mother Nature is featured in The Year Without a Santa Claus voiced by Rhoda Mann. This version is the mother of Heat Miser and Snow Miser. She was played by Carol Kane in the 2006 live-action version.
 Mother Nature appears in the 2008 sequel A Miser Brothers' Christmas voiced by Patricia Hamilton. Besides Heat Miser and Snow Miser, she is also shown to be the mother of Earthquake, Thunder and Lightning, the Tides, and North Wind. After Santa Claus was injured during one of the Miser Brothers' feuds (with some part of North Wind's henchmen secretly sabotaging Santa's new sleigh), she and Mrs. Claus make the Miser Brothers work at Santa's workshop to make it up to her.
 Mother Nature appears as a recurring character in The Smurfs voiced by June Foray.
 Progressive rock band Kansas recorded the song "Death of Mother Nature Suite" as a protest against industrialization.
 Mother Earth appears in The Earth Day Special, portrayed by Bette Midler. When she falls from the sky and faints due to the problems with nature, she is rushed to the hospital where she is tended to by Doogie Howser and other doctors.
 Mother Nature is featured in Happily Ever After, voiced by Phyllis Diller. She is depicted as the most powerful force of good in this movie, having complete control over nature, as well as the ability to create creatures from potions she makes in her sanctuary.
 Mother Nature is a recurring character in The New Woody Woodpecker Show, voiced by B.J. Ward. She is depicted as a fairy who often makes sure that Woody Woodpecker is doing his part in nature.
 Mother Nature is a supporting character in The Santa Clause 2 and The Santa Clause 3: The Escape Clause, portrayed by Aisha Tyler. She is shown as the head leader of the Council of Legendary Figures (which also consists of Santa Claus, Easter Bunny, Cupid, Father Time, Sandman, Tooth Fairy and Jack Frost).
 Mother Nature is featured in John Hancock written by Bo Bissett. She is referred to as Tara, a tribute to her name in Roman Mythology which is Terra or Terra Mater.
 Mother Nature is a recurring character featured in Stargate SG-1. She is portrayed as an ascended Ancient called Oma Desala.
 The animated film Epic features a character named Queen Tara (voiced by Beyoncé Knowles) who is a Mother Nature-like being.
 Mother Nature is a character in the Guardians of Childhood series by William Joyce. The long lost daughter of the Boogieman Pitch, she is a young woman who can control phenomenons of nature. She stays hidden while she watches the world. Her character is expanded in the latest book The Sandman and the War of Dreams.
 She appears in an ad campaign for Tampax feminine hygiene products, as a woman in a green tweed skirt-suit, handing a red "gift" to young women, who typically chase her away or beat her up, as the voiceover says, "Outsmart Mother Nature".
 Mother Nature appears in a major recurring role in the seventh season of Once Upon a Time. Mother Nature is a title for the leader of the dryads. The previous Mother Nature was Mother Flora (portrayed by Gabrielle Miller). Following the death of Mother Flora at the hands of some humans, Gothel (portrayed by Emma Booth) becomes the next Mother Nature.
 Mother Nature is mentioned in the hit song "It's Raining Men." by The Weather Girls & eventually remixed by RuPaul. The lyrics say she is a single woman who is to blessed... That she took on the heavens, every angel, and rearranged the sky so that each and every woman could find the perfect guy."
 A Mother Nature costume was used for a contestant in the sixth season of The Masked Singer. She was revealed to be actress Vivica A. Fox where she was eliminated during the two-night premiere alongside Dwight Howard as "Octopus" and Toni Braxton as "Pufferfish".

See also

 Amalur
 Atabey (goddess)
 Ecofeminism
 Father Time
 Gaia hypothesis
 Mother goddess
 Pantheism

References

External links

Allegory
Comparative mythology
Personifications
Symbols